Guibemantis pulcher is a species of frog in the family Mantellidae.
It is endemic to Madagascar.
Its natural habitats are subtropical or tropical moist lowland forests, subtropical or tropical swamps, subtropical or tropical moist montane forests, and heavily degraded former forest.
It is threatened by habitat loss.

Related pages
Amphibians of Madagascar

References

Mantellidae
Endemic frogs of Madagascar
Taxonomy articles created by Polbot
Amphibians described in 1882